The Virginia Slims of Richmond is a defunct WTA Tour affiliated women's tennis tournament held in 1970 and from 1972 to 1973. It was held at the Westwood Racquet Club in Richmond, Virginia in the United States and played on indoor clay courts. The 1970 invitational tournament was the second women's only tennis tournament after the 1970 Houston Women's Invitation.

Past finals

Singles

Doubles

See also
 Richmond WCT – men's tournament

References

External links
 WTA Results Archive

 
Indoor tennis tournaments
Carpet court tennis tournaments
WTA Tour
Defunct tennis tournaments in the United States
1970 establishments in Virginia
1973 disestablishments in Virginia
Recurring sporting events established in 1970
Recurring sporting events disestablished in 1973